is the tenth studio album by P-Model and the first by its "revised" lineup.

Overview
Following the dissolution of the "defrosted" lineup of P-Model, leader Susumu Hirasawa focused on his solo career, releasing Aurora and performing accompanying concerts. Some of the live shows featured a backing band, select members of which were sought by Hirasawa to join P-Model. Wataru Kamiryo, who worked with Hirasawa as the drummer of Soft Ballet in a special 1991 guest show, agreed to join. Kenji Konishi, a friend of Hirasawa's since 1979 who had collaborated with him intermittently since 1985, offered himself as a member, to Hirasawa's surprise. To fill out the fourth member role, Konishi convinced Hajime Fukuma, a chat room friend of his to join the band. This  lineup debuted with two shows in December 1994.

The recording of Fune started immediately after Hirasawa finished his solo album Sim City. His main technological interest of the time had switched from Amiga personal computers to the rapidly growing internet, leading the band to produce music based around this idea. Although the band members did use the internet on the making of the album, its presence on the recording process was minimal compared to their latter releases. Konishi and Fukuma worked alongside Hirasawa on his home studio; vocals, drums and analog multitrack mixing were done on a conventional recording facility.

As a concept album, it tells a story of the band dividing itself into two parties to sail through cyberspace and connect the opposing ideals of the spiritual and the technological. Hirasawa commented, "No, honestly, I think this might be the most easy-to-understand release in P-Model's history of works. The overall intended message is 'Come over here, it's super interesting, I'm already into it too, you're definitely gonna get hooked!'; a passionate invitation to the computer network."

Konishi had equal creative control as Hirasawa. His rhythmic style of songwriting coupled with Kamiryo's use of an acoustic drum kit resulted in a beat-heavy album. P-Model's overall sound changed due to the heavy layering of tracks with synths and other assorted electronics.

Track listing
All tracks written by Susumu Hirasawa, except where noted. All tracks arranged by P-Model, except "Tide", by Hirasawa and Kenji Konishi.

"Mirror Image" contains samples of "Mental Manipulation", "Inner Tripping", "Percepts" and "Acoustic Space"; from the album The Medium is the Message (a posthumous compilation of Marshall McLuhan sound bites).

Personnel
Susumu Hirasawa - Vocals, Electric guitar, Synthesizers, Miburi, Sampler, Amiga, Vista, Sequencer, Programming, Production
Hajime Fukuma - System-1, Backing vocals
Kenji Konishi - System-2, Lead vocals on "Welcome" and "Fune", Backing vocals
Wataru Kamiryo - AlgoRhythm
Masayuki Momo - Synthesizer Programming
Masanori Chinzei - Engineering
Yūichi Kenjo - Production (Executive)

Release history

Corrective Errors

Corrective Errors～remix of 舟 is an album of remixes by Hajime Fukuma and Kenji Konishi of songs from Fune, released on Hirasawa's own indie label SYUN. Released before Fune itself, it provided an early glimpse into the album. A single featuring a slightly different mix of "Wrecked Ship Saksit re-mix" was released as a special gift to consumers of SYUN releases. This was the last P-Model release pressed on vinyl.

Track listing

Release history

References

External links
 Fune at NO ROOM - The official site of Susumu Hirasawa (P-MODEL)
 
 Fune +3 at iTunes Japan
 Fune +3 at amazon.co.jp

1995 albums
Japanese-language albums
P-Model albums
Nippon Columbia albums